Prayer for the Halcyon Fear is the debut album of folk rock band Tiny Lights, released in 1985 through Uriel Music.

Release and reception 

Nitsuh Abebe of allmusic said the album has "the continual loose brilliance that's typically only found on debut records." He awarded Prayer for the Halcyon Fear four out of five stars, calling it the band's best effort to date. Critics of the Trouser Press called it "a delightful debut" that has "a mildly psychedelic sense of play that sets the band apart."

In 1990, the album was re-issued by Absolute A Go Go Records on CD and cassette, containing "Flowers Through the Air" and "Zippity-Do-Dah" as bonus material. Bob Bert provided liner notes which detailed the band's history.

Track listing

Personnel 

Tiny Lights
 Donna Croughn – vocals, violin, percussion, production
 Andy Demos – drums, soprano saxophone
 Dave Dreiwitz – bass guitar, double bass, trumpet
 John Hamilton – guitar, acoustic guitar, vocals, piano, production
 Jane Scarpantoni – cello, vocals

Additional musicians and production
 Henry Hirsch – production, vocals and keyboards on "Song of the Weak" & "G. Does the Limbo"

External links

References 

1985 debut albums
Tiny Lights albums